De Vink is a railway station in the Netherlands. It is located near the former hamlet of De Vink, currently a part of Leiden.

The station re-opened in 1985. It is wedged in between the city of Leiden and the neighbouring town of Voorschoten. The tracks in the direction of The Hague are on Leiden ground. The tracks in the direction of Leiden are on Voorschoten ground. Because of this, it is currently the only railway station in the Netherlands not to feature the name of the city it is located in.

Train services
The following services call at De Vink:
2x per hour local service (sprinter) The Hague - Leiden - Sassenheim - Nieuw-Vennep - Hoofdorp - Schiphol - Amsterdam Lelylaan - Amsterdam Sloterdijk - Amsterdam Centraal
2x per hour local service (stoptrein) The Hague - Leiden - Haarlem

Gallery

External links
NS website 
Dutch Public Transport journey planner 

Railway stations in South Holland
Railway stations opened in 1906
Railway stations closed in 1928
Railway stations opened in 1985
Railway stations on the Oude Lijn
1985 establishments in the Netherlands
Buildings and structures in Leiden
Railway stations in the Netherlands opened in the 20th century